Tjaša Pintar (born February 15, 1997) is a Slovenian swimmer. She competed on the Slovenian team in the women's 4 × 200 metre freestyle relay event at the 2016 Summer Olympics.

In 2014, she represented Slovenia at the Summer Youth Olympics held in Nanjing, China.

References

1997 births
Living people
Slovenian female swimmers
Olympic swimmers of Slovenia
Swimmers at the 2016 Summer Olympics
Swimmers at the 2014 Summer Youth Olympics
Tennessee Volunteers women's swimmers
Slovenian female freestyle swimmers
20th-century Slovenian women
21st-century Slovenian women
Mediterranean Games medalists in swimming
Mediterranean Games gold medalists for Slovenia
Swimmers at the 2022 Mediterranean Games